Nellie Miller Mann (March 27, 1897 – February 2, 1997) was a prominent member of the Mennonite Church and a renowned figure in the Near East Relief, an organization to assist refugees of war and massacre in and around the Middle East. During her time in the Near East Relief (now Near East Foundation), Nellie Miller Mann was instrumental in caring for hundreds of Armenian refugees who had survived the Armenian genocide. During her time working with the refugees, Miller Mann wrote and photographed much of what she experienced. Her writings and photographs have been recently been published in a book entitled, Letters from Syria 1921-1923.

Early life
Nellie Miller Mann was born to parents Abram Rohrer and Selena Bell (Wade) Miller in Elkhart, Indiana, on March 27, 1897. During her early life, she became a member of the Mennonite Church. Mann then went to Goshen, Indiana, where she attended Goshen College. She studied there from 1918 to 1921. While studying there, she had overheard of the situation regarding the Armenians in the Ottoman Empire. Having been motivated to help, Orie Miller, the leader of the Mennonite Relief Commission, which later became known as Mennonite Central Committee, arranged for a number of Mennonite young men to go to Russia, Turkey and Syria under the Near East Relief Foundation to assist the refugees and orphans. After joining the Near East Relief, she immediately set sail to Syria where she was to assist Armenian refugees who have been deported outside of the Ottoman Empire as a result of the Armenian genocide.

Near East Relief

It was decided by the committee that Miller-Mann was to be shipped to Beirut where she was to serve as secretary to Ray Bender, the treasurer of the Near East Relief in the Beirut headquarters. She left from the New York City harbor on August 20, 1921, on the S.S. Patria, a French ocean liner, taking four weeks for her to cross the ocean, change ships, and stop at numerous ports in Italy, Greece, Egypt and Palestine, before arriving in Beirut on September 20, 1921. Earlier, in January 1920, as the Turkish War of Independence took hold, Mustafa Kemal advanced his troops into Marash where the Battle of Marash ensued against the French Armenian Legion. The battle resulted in a Turkish victory alongside the massacres of 5,000 – 12,000 Armenians spelling the end of the remaining Armenian population in the region. Upon her arrival in Beirut, she noted that in addition to the Armenian refugees who escaped in 1915, there was continuous influx of refugees as a result of the circumstances for the Armenians in Cilicia. She described the situation as follows:

While in Beirut, Miller-Mann went beyond her duties as a secretary and assisted as many orphans as possible in the surrounding area. The orphans by this time had reached an estimated 130,000. Throughout this period, Mann kept a diary where she wrote extensively about the plight of the orphans and her service to various orphanages. She notes that when many of the orphaned children arrived in Syria, they were placed in one of the 18 or 20 orphanages in the vicinity, where they were fed, clothed, given medical care and given a vocational education.

Miller-Mann first worked with the orphanage of Antilyas, which, as she noted in a December 6, 1921, entry of her diary, was filled with Armenian orphaned girls:

Nellie Miller-Mann was instrumental in helping prominent Danish missionary Maria Jacobsen with her orphanage called "The Bird's Nest". In January 1922, Jacobsen transferred many orphans to Beirut. After moving to Zouk Michail in July 1922, she established an orphanage which sheltered 208 Armenian children from Cilicia. Through the efforts of the Danish missionary, an Armenian orphanage that had previously been owned by the Near East Relief was acquired by The Women's Missionary Workers (K.M.A.) in 1928. The orphanage, which was located in Byblos, became known as the "Bird's Nest" and was to eventually help 400 orphaned children who were aged from infants to up to nine years old. In January 1922, while Jacobsen was occupied transferring the orphans to Beirut, Miller-Mann visited the orphanage when it was under Near East Relief supervision. At the time of her initial visit, she noted that there were 600 Armenian orphans stationed at the orphanage and that they arrived about a year ago from Marash (now Kahramanmaras) and Aintab (now Gaziantep).

While in the Middle-East, Miller-Mann toured the region and visited several sites including Baalbeck, Damascus, and Aleppo.

Miller-Mann continued assisting the orphaned refugees until retired from her tours of duty in 1923.

Later life
Nellie Miller married to Cleo Mann on August 25, 1924. She eventually taught at a local Sunday school. Cleo and Nellie Mann moved to Indianapolis where they were instrumental in the founding of the first Mennonite church in the city.

She died on February 2, 1997, at the age of 99 in Goshen, Indiana.

Legacy
Upon her return to the United States, Nellie Miller Mann was awarded the Near East Relief Service medal by the national field director of the Near East Foundation for her significant contributions to the Foundation and the relief effort.

Her writings and photographs have been recently published in a 226-page book entitled Letters from Syria 1921-1923: A Response to the Armenian Tragedy, Including Stories, Travel and Reports.

References

People from Elkhart, Indiana
Witnesses of the Armenian genocide
1897 births
1997 deaths
Mennonite missionaries
American Protestant missionaries
Female Christian missionaries
Protestant missionaries in Syria
Protestant missionaries in Turkey